Compass plant is a common name of several plants:

 Lactuca serriola, native to Europe, widely introduced to temperate regions
 Silene acaulis, also known as moss campion or cushion pink, found in the Arctic and in mountain habitats
 Silphium laciniatum, native to eastern North America
 Wyethia angustifolia, California compass plant, native to western North America